Felimida purpurea is a species of colourful sea slug, a dorid nudibranch, a marine gastropod mollusc in the family Chromodorididae.

Distribution
This species occurs in the Mediterranean Sea, and on the Atlantic coast of Europe and Africa from the Bay of Biscay to Cape Verde and west as far as the Azores.

Description
Felimida purpurea is a chromodorid nudibranch with a plain white to pale purple mantle edged with a line of orange-yellow. Inside the yellow margin are conspicuous white mantle glands embedded in the tissue. The rhinophores and gills are purple-pink with white tips. The body length varies between 35 mm and 50 mm. This species was transferred from the genus Chromodoris to the genus Felimida in a revision of the family Chromodorididae using DNA characters which showed that the Atlantic species of Chromodoris formed a distinct clade.

References

 Gofas, S.; Le Renard, J.; Bouchet, P. (2001). Mollusca, in: Costello, M.J. et al. (Ed.) (2001). European register of marine species: a check-list of the marine species in Europe and a bibliography of guides to their identification. Collection Patrimoines Naturels, 50: pp. 180–213 
 Debelius, H. & Kuiter, R.H. (2007) Nudibranchs of the world. ConchBooks, Frankfurt, 360 pp.  page(s): 183.

Chromodorididae
Gastropods described in 1831
Molluscs of the Atlantic Ocean
Molluscs of the Mediterranean Sea
Molluscs of the Azores
Gastropods of Cape Verde